The 1953–54 AHL season was the 18th season of the American Hockey League. Six teams played 70 games each in the schedule. The Cleveland Barons won their seventh Calder Cup championship.

Team changes
 The St. Louis Flyers cease operations.

Final standings
Note: GP = Games played; W = Wins; L = Losses; T = Ties; GF = Goals for; GA = Goals against; Pts = Points;

Scoring leaders

Note: GP = Games played; G = Goals; A = Assists; Pts = Points; PIM = Penalty minutes

 complete list

Calder Cup playoffs
First round
Cleveland Barons defeated Buffalo Bisons 3 games to 0.
Hershey Bears defeated Pittsburgh Hornets 3 games to 2.
Finals
Cleveland Barons defeated Hershey Bears 4 games to 2, to win the Calder Cup. 
 list of scores

Trophy and Award winners
Team Awards

Individual Awards

See also
List of AHL seasons

References
AHL official site
AHL Hall of Fame
HockeyDB

American Hockey League seasons
AHL